Kishacoquillas Creek (pronounced Kish-e-kō-kwil´-lis) is a  tributary of the Juniata River in Mifflin County, Pennsylvania in the United States.

Kishacoquillas Creek (named for a friendly Native American inhabitant) drains the Kishacoquillas Valley, running along the foot of the Jacks Mountain ridge where it intersects with Honey Creek before passing through the Mann Narrows water gap and joins the Juniata River at the borough of Lewistown.

Tributaries
Honey Creek

See also
List of rivers of Pennsylvania

References

External links
U.S. Geological Survey: PA stream gaging stations

Rivers of Pennsylvania
Tributaries of the Juniata River
Rivers of Mifflin County, Pennsylvania
Pennsylvania placenames of Native American origin